Philip Awiti-Alcaraz (born 13 August 1993) is a British judoka.

Judo career
Awiti-Alcaraz became champion of Great Britain, winning the half-heavyweight division at the British Judo Championships in 2015.

He won the bronze medal at the 2017 Judo Grand Prix Cancún in the -100 kg category.

References

External links
 

1993 births
Living people
British male judoka